The 1953 Torneo Godó was the first edition of the Torneo Godó tennis event and it took place from June 3–7, 1953.

Seeds

Draw

Finals

Earlier rounds

Top half

Bottom half

External links
 ITF – Tournament details
 Official tournament website
 ATP tournament profile

Barcelona Open (tennis)
Godo
Spain